James Lawrence King (born December 20, 1927) is a senior United States district judge of the United States District Court for the Southern District of Florida, and one of the longest serving federal judges in the United States.

Education and career

Born in Miami, Florida, King received a Bachelor of Arts in Education degree from the University of Florida in 1949 and a Bachelor of Laws from the Fredric G. Levin College of Law at the University of Florida in 1953. There, he was a member of the law review and Phi Kappa Tau fraternity. King served in the United States Air Force from 1953 to 1955 and was in a private law practice in Miami from 1953 until 1964 when he became a member of the Florida Board of Regents. From 1964 until 1970, he was a circuit judge of the Eleventh Judicial Circuit Court of Florida. During his service as a circuit judge, King sat by designation with the Florida Supreme Court in 1965 and with the Florida Third District Court of Appeal from 1966 to 1967.

Federal judicial service

On October 7, 1970, King was nominated by President Richard Nixon to a new seat on the United States District Court for the Southern District of Florida established by 84 Stat. 294. King was confirmed by the United States Senate on October 13, 1970, and received his commission on October 19, 1970. He served as Chief Judge from 1984 to 1991, assuming senior status on December 20, 1992.

Notable rulings

In 1981, King overruled the State of Florida in determining that treasure hunter Mel Fisher was the rightful owner of treasure salvaged from the 1715 wreck of a Spanish galleon, in the Cobb Coin case. In 1999 he ruled that relatives of the Brothers to the Rescue pilots shot down by the Cuban Air Force could sue Cuba for wrongful death. He also dismissed challenges to Florida's felony disenfranchisement law and Florida's prohibition against homosexual adoption. King was ultimately affirmed by the Eleventh Circuit in both cases.

In 1989, King dismissed the filing of the Christic Institute for Avirgan v. Hull (932 F.2d 1572), the main civil litigation concerning the Iran-Contra affair.

Honor

On April 30, 1996, the United States Congress renamed the United States Courthouse in Miami the James Lawrence King Federal Justice Building.

See also
 List of United States federal judges by longevity of service

References

Sources
 

1927 births
Living people
University of Florida alumni
Florida lawyers
Justices of the Florida Supreme Court
Judges of the United States District Court for the Southern District of Florida
United States district court judges appointed by Richard Nixon
20th-century American judges
Fredric G. Levin College of Law alumni
21st-century American judges